The Tuoba (reconstructed Middle Chinese pronunciation: *tʰak-bɛt), also known as the Taugast or Tabgach ( Tabγač), was a Xianbei clan in Imperial China.

During the Sixteen Kingdoms period in northern China, the Tuoba clan established and ruled the dynastic state of Dai from 310 to 376. In 386, the Tuoba clan restored Dai, only to rename the dynasty "Wei" (known retroactively in Chinese historiography as the "Northern Wei") in the same year. The Northern Wei was a powerful dynasty that unified northern China after the Sixteen Kingdoms period and became increasingly sinicized. As a result, from 496, the name "Tuoba" disappeared by an edict of the Emperor Xiaowen of Northern Wei, who adopted the Han surname of Yuan. After the Northern Wei split into the Eastern Wei and Western Wei in 535, the Western Wei briefly restored the Tuoba name in 554.

A branch of the Tanguts originally bore the surname Tuoba, but their chieftains were subsequently bestowed the Chinese surnames Li and Zhao by the Tang dynasty and the Song dynasty respectively. The Tangut Tuoba clan later adopted the surname Weiming and eventually established the Western Xia dynasty in northwestern China.

Ethnicity and language

The Tuoba and their Rouran enemies descended from common ancestors. The Weishu stated that the Rourans were of Donghu origins and Tuoba originated from Xianbei, who were also Donghu's descendants. The Donghu ancestors of Tuoba and Rouran were most likely proto-Mongols. Nomadic confederations of Inner Asia were often linguistically diverse, and Tuoba Wei comprised the para-Mongolic Tuoba as well as assimilated Turkic peoples such as Hegu (紇骨) and Yizhan (乙旃); consequently, about one quarter of the Tuoba tribal confederation was composed of Dingling elements as Tuoba migrated from northeastern Mongolia to northern China.

Alexander Vovin (2007) identifies the Tuoba language as a Mongolic language. On the other hand, Juha Janhunen proposed that the Tuoba might have spoken an Oghur Turkic language. René Grousset, writing in the early 20th century, identifies the Tuoba as a Turkic tribe. According to Peter Boodberg, a 20th-century scholar, the Tuoba language was essentially Turkic with Mongolic admixture. Chen Sanping observed that the Tuoba language contains both elements. Liu Xueyao stated that the Tuoba may have had their own language which should not be assumed to be identical with any other known languages.

History

The distribution of the Xianbei people ranged from present day Northeast China to Mongolia, and the Tuoba were one of the largest clans among the western Xianbei, ranging from present day Shanxi province and westward and northwestward. They established the state of Dai from 310 to 376 AD and ruled as the Northern Wei from 386 to 536. The Tuoba states of Dai and Northern Wei also claimed to possess the quality of earth in the Chinese Wu Xing theory. All the chieftains of the Tuoba were revered as emperors in the Book of Wei and the History of the Northern Dynasties.

Marriage policies
The Northern Wei started to arrange for Chinese elites to marry daughters of the Xianbei Tuoba royal family in the 480s. More than fifty percent of Tuoba Xianbei princesses of the Northern Wei were married to southern Chinese men from the imperial families and aristocrats from southern China of the Southern dynasties who defected and moved north to join the Northern Wei. Some Chinese exiled royalty fled from southern China and defected to the Xianbei. Several daughters of the Xianbei Tuoba Emperor Xiaowen of Northern Wei were married to Chinese elites: the Han Chinese Liu Song royal  married  of the Northern Wei;  married , a descendant of Jin dynasty (266–420) royalty;  married ; and  married Xiao Baoyin (萧宝夤), a member of Southern Qi royalty. Emperor Xiaozhuang of Northern Wei's sister the Shouyang Princess was wedded to Emperor Wu of Liang's son . One of Emperor Xiaowu of Northern Wei's sisters was married to Zhang Huan, a Han Chinese, according to the Book of Zhou (Zhoushu). His name is given as Zhang Xin in the Book of Northern Qi (Bei Qishu) and History of the Northern Dynasties (Beishi) which mention his marriage to a Xianbei princess of Wei. His personal name was changed due to a naming taboo on the emperor's name. He was the son of Zhang Qiong.

When the Eastern Jin dynasty ended, Northern Wei received the Han Chinese Jin prince  as a refugee. A Northern Wei Princess married Sima Chuzhi, giving birth to Sima Jinlong (司馬金龍). Northern Liang Xiongnu King Juqu Mujian's daughter married Sima Jinlong.

Genetics
According to Zhou (2006) the haplogroup frequencies of the Tuoba Xianbei were 43.75% haplogroup D, 31.25% haplogroup C, 12.5% haplogroup B, 6.25% haplogroup A and 6.25% "other."

Zhou (2014) obtained mitochondrial DNA analysis from 17 Tuoba Xianbei, which indicated that these specimens were, similarly, completely East Asian in their maternal origins, belonging to haplogroups D, C, B, A and haplogroup G.

Chieftains of Tuoba Clan 219-377 (as Princes of Dai 315-377)

Legacy of the Tuoba/Tabgach name

As a consequence of the Northern Wei's extensive contacts with Central Asia, Turkic sources identified Tabgach, also transcribed as Tawjach, Tawġač, Tamghaj, Tamghach, Tafgaj, and Tabghaj, as the ruler or country of China until the 13th century.

The Orkhon inscriptions in the Orkhon Valley in modern-day Mongolia from the 8th century identify Tabgach as China.  

In the 11th century text, the Dīwān Lughāt al-Turk ("Compendium of the languages of the Turks"), Turkic scholar Mahmud al-Kashgari, writing in Baghdad for an Arabic audience, describes Tawjach as one of the three components comprising China. 

At the time of his writing, China's northern fringe was ruled by Khitan-led Liao dynasty while the remainder of China proper was ruled by the Northern Song dynasty. Arab sources used Sīn (Persian: Chīn) to refer to northern China and Māsīn (Persian: Machīn) to represent southern China. In his account, al-Kashgari refers to his homeland, around Kashgar, then part of the Kara-Khanid Khanate, as Lower China.
The rulers of the Karakanids adopted Temahaj Khan (Turkic: the Khan of China) in their title, and minted coins bearing this title. Much of the realm of the Karakhanids including Transoxania and the western Tarim Basin had been under the rule of the Tang dynasty prior to the Battle of Talas in 751, and the Karakhanids continued to identify with China, several centuries later.

See also
Chinese sovereign
History of China
Jin dynasty (266–420)
Khitan people
Ethnic groups in Chinese history

References

Citations

Sources 

 Bazin, L. "Research of T'o-pa language (5th century AD)", T'oung Pao, 39/4-5, 1950 ["Recherches sur les parlers T'o-pa (5e siècle après J.C.)"] (in French) Subject: Toba Tatar language
 
 Boodberg, P.A. "The Language of the T'o-pa Wei", Harvard Journal of Asiatic Studies,  Vol. 1, 1936.
 Clauson, G. "Turk, Mongol, Tungus", Asia Major, New Series, Vol. 8, Pt 1, 1960, pp. 117–118
 Grousset, R. "The Empire of the Steppes: A History of Central Asia", Rutgers University Press, 1970, p. 57, 63–66, 557 Note 137,   
 
 
 Pelliot, P.A. "L'Origine de T'ou-kiue; nom chinoise des Turks", T'oung Pao, 1915, p. 689
 Pelliot, P.A. "L'Origine de T'ou-kiue; nom chinoise des Turks", Journal Asiatic, 1925, No 1, p. 254-255
 Pelliot, P.A. "L'Origine de T'ou-kiue; nom chinoise des Turks", T'oung Pao, 1925–1926, pp. 79–93;
 Zuev, Y.A.  "Ethnic History Of Usuns", Works of Academy of Sciences Kazakh SSR, History, Archeology And Ethnography Institute, Alma-Ata, Vol. VIII, 1960, (In Russian)

 
Ancient peoples of China
Xianbei